Matías Rafael Lacava González (born 24 October 2002) is a Venezuelan football player who plays for Portuguese club Vizela, on loan from Academia Puerto Cabello. Mainly an attacking midfielder, he can also play as a winger.

Club career

Early career
Born in Chacao, Caracas, Lacava joined FC Barcelona's La Masia in 2013, aged ten, from hometown side Fratelsa Sport FC. He left the club in 2015 after having "contractual problems", and moved to Lazio.

In the 2018 summer, Lacava left Lazio and returned to his home country with Academia Puerto Cabello. On 16 January 2019, under the authorization of FIFA, he signed a youth contract with S.L. Benfica, but returned to Puerto Cabello in July.

Academia Puerto Cabello
Lacava made his first team debut for Academia Puerto Cabello on 28 July 2019, coming on as a half-time substitute for Joaquín Suárez in a 1–2 home loss against Aragua. He scored his first professional goals six days later, netting a brace in a 3–2 away win against Metropolitanos; it was his first start as a senior.

Loan to Santos
On 3 August 2021, Lacava joined Campeonato Brasileiro Série A side Santos on loan until December 2022, and was initially assigned to the under-23 team. He made his first team debut on 13 November, replacing Marcos Guilherme in a 0–0 away draw against Atlético Goianiense.

On 31 January 2022, Santos announced that Lacava's loan was terminated on a "mutual agreement".

Loan to Tondela
On 31 January 2022, just hours after leaving Santos, Lacava returned to Portugal after agreeing to a six-month loan deal with Tondela.

International career
Lacava represented Venezuela at under-17 and under-23 levels in the 2019 South American U-17 Championship and the 2020 CONMEBOL Pre-Olympic Tournament, respectively. On 31 May 2021, he was called up to the full side by manager José Peseiro for two 2022 FIFA World Cup qualification matches against Bolivia and Uruguay.

Personal life
Lacava is the son of Carabobo state governor Rafael Lacava.

Career statistics

References

External links

2002 births
Living people
Venezuelan footballers
Association football midfielders
Association football wingers
Venezuelan Primera División players
Academia Puerto Cabello players
Campeonato Brasileiro Série A players
Santos FC players
Primeira Liga players
Liga Portugal 2 players
C.D. Tondela players
F.C. Vizela players
Venezuela youth international footballers
Venezuelan expatriate footballers
Venezuelan expatriate sportspeople in Spain
Venezuelan expatriate sportspeople in Italy
Venezuelan expatriate sportspeople in Portugal
Venezuelan expatriate sportspeople in Brazil
Expatriate footballers in Spain
Expatriate footballers in Italy
Expatriate footballers in Portugal
Expatriate footballers in Brazil
People from Miranda (state)